Marko Simić (born 7 November 1993) is a Serbian football forward for FK Kolubara.

Career
Born in Belgrade, he played for Srem Jakovo, Teleoptik, Šumadija Aranđelovac and Kolubara. He signed with OFK Beograd in summer 2015.

Career statistics

References

External links
 Marko Simić stats at utakmica.rs 
 
 

1993 births
Living people
Footballers from Belgrade
Association football forwards
Serbian footballers
Serbian expatriate footballers
FK Srem Jakovo players
FK Teleoptik players
FK Šumadija Aranđelovac players
FK Kolubara players
OFK Beograd players
FK Mladost Lučani players
FK Novi Pazar players
FK Spartaks Jūrmala players
FK Bežanija players
FK Sloboda Užice players
OFK Bačka players
Serbian First League players
Serbian SuperLiga players
Latvian Higher League players
Serbian expatriate sportspeople in Latvia
Expatriate footballers in Latvia